The anterior humeral circumflex artery (anterior circumflex artery, anterior circumflex humeral artery) is an artery in the arm. It is one of two circumflexing arteries that branch from the axillary artery, the other being the posterior humeral circumflex artery. The anterior humeral circumflex artery is considerably smaller than the posterior and arises nearly opposite to it, from the lateral side of the axillary artery.

The anterior humeral circumflex artery runs horizontally, beneath the coracobrachialis and short head of the biceps brachii muscle, in front of the neck of the humerus.

On reaching the intertubercular sulcus, it gives off a branch which ascends in the sulcus to supply the head of the humerus and the shoulder-joint.

The trunk of the vessel is then continued onward beneath the long head of the biceps brachii and the deltoideus muscle, and anastomoses with the posterior humeral circumflex artery.

Additional Images

See also
 Posterior humeral circumflex artery

References

External links
 
 

Arteries of the upper limb